Podmelnica is a village in Croatia, under the Slunj township, in Karlovac County. Surnames in Podmelnica include: Obajdin, Holjevac, Štefanac, Jareb, Oštrina, Begović, Blašković and Bosanac.

References

Geography of Croatia
Populated places in Karlovac County